Dobrava pod Rako is a small settlement to the south of Raka in the Municipality of Krško in eastern Slovenia. The area is part of the traditional region of Lower Carniola. It is now included in the Lower Sava Statistical Region.

Name
The name of the settlement was changed from Dobrava to Dobrava pod Rako in 1953.

References

External links
Dobrava pod Rako on Geopedia

Populated places in the Municipality of Krško